Hibecovirus is a subgenus of viruses in the genus Betacoronavirus, consisting of a single species, Bat Hp-betacoronavirus Zhejiang2013.

Strains forming the viral species Bat Hp-betacoronavirus Zhejiang2013 were discovered in Hipposideros pratti bats from China in 2013.

References

Virus subgenera
Betacoronaviruses